The S9 is a railway service of RER Vaud that provides hourly service between  and  in the Swiss cantons of Vaud and Fribourg, respectively. Swiss Federal Railways, the national railway company of Switzerland, operates the service.

Operations 
The S5 and S6 make local stops, combining with the S9 and the InterRegio 15 for service roughly ever 15 fifteen minutes. North of Palézieux, the S8 pairs with the S9 for half-hourly service to  except on Sundays.

History 
RER Vaud introduced the S9 designation with the December 2015 timetable change, replacing the S21. Both routes operated between Lausanne and Payerne. The S9 was extended from Payerne to Kerzers in December 2017.

References

External links 

 2022 timetable: Lausanne–Payerne and Payerne–Kerzers

RER Vaud lines
Transport in the canton of Fribourg
Transport in the canton of Vaud